The 22807 / 08 Santragachi–Chennai Central AC Express is a Superfast Express train belonging to Indian Railways – South Eastern Railway zone that runs between Santragachi Junction and Chennai Central in India.

It operates as train number 22807 from Santragachi Junction to Chennai Central and as train number 22808 in the reverse direction, serving the 4 states of West Bengal, Odisha, Andhra Pradesh and Tamil Nadu.

Coaches

The 22807 / 08 Santragachi–Chennai Central AC Express has 1 AC First Class, 4 AC 2 tier, 10 AC 3 tier & 2 End on Generator cum Luggage Rack Coaches. In addition, it carries a pantry car coach   .

As is customary with most train services in India, coach composition may be amended at the discretion of Indian Railways depending on demand.

Service

The 22807 Santragachi–Chennai Central AC Express covers the distance of 1655 kilometres in 27 hours 45 mins (59.64 km/hr) and in 26 hours 30 mins as 22808 Chennai Central–Santragachi AC Express (62.45 km/hr).

As the average speed of the train is above , as per Indian Railways rules, its fare includes a Superfast surcharge.

Routeing

The 22807 / 08 Santragachi–Chennai Central AC Express runs from Santragachi Junction via Kharagpur Junction, Cuttack Junction, Bhubaneswar, Khurda Road Jn, Visakhapatnam, Vijayawada Junction, Gudur Junction to Chennai Central  .

It reverses direction of travel at Visakhapatnam.

Traction

As the route is fully electrified, a Santragachi-based WAP-4   hauls the train from Santragachi Junction up to Visakhapatnam, but these days this job is carried by a Santragachi-based WAP-7 and a Vijayawada-based WAP-1  locomotive powers the train for the remainder of its journey.

Operation

22807 Santragachi–Chennai Central AC Express runs from Santragachi Junction every Tuesday and Friday reaching Chennai Central the next day .

22808 Chennai Central–Santragachi AC Express runs from Chennai Central every Thursday and Sunday, reaching Santragachi Junction the next day .

References 

 http://www.scr.indianrailways.gov.in/view_detail.jsp?lang=0&id=0,5,268&dcd=3553&did=139124247753895977870EF61F32487E507DB6445DCF3.web103
 http://www.thehindu.com/news/national/tamil-nadu/superfast-express-train-between-chennai-santragachi/article5587410.ece
 https://www.youtube.com/watch?v=8gvcQFym2OI
 http://www.scr.indianrailways.gov.in/view_detail.jsp?lang=0&dcd=3493&id=0,5,268
 http://www.railnews.co.in/mosr-flags-off-santragachi-chennai-superfast-ac-exp-and-howrah-amta-emu-local/
 http://www.traveliks.com/trains/22807-santragachi-chennai-central-sf-ac-express-train-timings-schedule-22807
 https://www.youtube.com/watch?v=8owYouNdblA

External links

Rail transport in Howrah
Transport in Chennai
Rail transport in West Bengal
Rail transport in Odisha
Rail transport in Andhra Pradesh
Rail transport in Tamil Nadu
AC Express (Indian Railways) trains
Railway services introduced in 2014